Gaynelle Griffin Jones (November 20, 1948 – March 1, 2013) was an American jurist and lawyer.

She was born in Dallas, Texas and graduated from A. J. Moore High School. Jones received her bachelor's degree from Emerson College and her J.D. degree from Boston College Law School. In 1993, President Bill Clinton appointed Jones as United States Attorney for the Southern District of Texas. She was the first African-American woman to serve in that position.

Before her appointment as U.S. Attorney, Jones was also the first African-American woman to serve on the First Court of the Texas Courts of Appeals. In later years, she worked as litigation counsel for Hewlett-Packard Company and was an adjunct professor at the University of Houston Law School.

She practiced law for forty years in Massachusetts, Louisiana, and Texas specializing in corporate law and criminal law.

She was married to Robert Jones and had a daughter named Athena.

Death
She died on March 1, 2013, aged 64, in Houston, Texas, from cancer.

See also
 List of African-American jurists
 List of first women lawyers and judges in Texas

References

1948 births
2013 deaths
African-American judges
People from Dallas
Emerson College alumni
Boston College Law School alumni
Massachusetts lawyers
Texas state court judges
United States Attorneys for the Southern District of Texas
University of Houston faculty
20th-century American lawyers
21st-century American lawyers
20th-century American judges
Deaths from cancer in Texas
20th-century American women judges
20th-century African-American women
20th-century African-American people
American women academics
21st-century American women
21st-century African-American women
21st-century African-American people